Artonis is a genus of orb-weaver spiders first described by Eugène Simon in 1895.  it contains only two species, A. gallana from Ethiopia and A. bituberculata from Myanmar.

References

Araneidae
Araneomorphae genera
Taxa named by Eugène Simon